Wredeby Airfield  is an aerodrome located in Kouvola, Finland, about  southwest of Anjalankoski.

Facilities

See also
 List of airports in Finland

References

External links
 VFR Suomi/Finland – Wredeby Airfield
 Lentopaikat.net – Wredeby Airfield 
 Photo of Wredeby Airfield
 Video from aircraft landing at EFWB Wredeby

Airports in Finland
Buildings and structures in Kouvola
Buildings and structures in Kymenlaakso